Trigonometopus is a genus of flies in the family Lauxaniidae. There are more than 20 described species in Trigonometopus.

Species
These 25 species belong to the genus Trigonometopus:

Trigonometopus abnormis Shatalkin, 1999
Trigonometopus albifrons Knab, 1914
Trigonometopus albiseta Bezzi, 1913
Trigonometopus alboapicalis Shatalkin, 1997
Trigonometopus albocostatus Hendel, 1912
Trigonometopus angustipennis Knab, 1914
Trigonometopus brevicornis Meijere, 1911
Trigonometopus brunneicosta Malloch, 1927
Trigonometopus canus Meijere, 1916
Trigonometopus cuneatus Shatalkin, 1997
Trigonometopus deceptor (Malloch, 1927)
Trigonometopus eborifacies Shatalkin, 1997
Trigonometopus forficula Shatalkin, 1997
Trigonometopus fuscipennis Hendel, 1912
Trigonometopus gressitti Sasakawa, 2002
Trigonometopus immaculipennis Malloch, 1923
Trigonometopus japonicus Sasakawa, 2002
Trigonometopus nigripalpis Shatalkin, 1997
Trigonometopus punctipennis Coquillett, 1898
Trigonometopus rotundicornis Williston, 1896
Trigonometopus semibrunneus Malloch, 1929
Trigonometopus submaculipennis Malloch, 1927
Trigonometopus tinctipennis Meijere, 1924
Trigonometopus vittatus Loew, 1869
Trigonometopus zeylanicus Senior-White, 1921

References

Further reading

 

Lauxaniidae
Lauxanioidea genera
Articles created by Qbugbot
Taxa named by Pierre-Justin-Marie Macquart